Fraser Rogers (born 19 December 1995 in Swindon) is a British Grand Prix motorcycle racer. He currently competes in the British National Superstock 1000 Championship aboard a Kawasaki ZX-10R.

Career statistics

2008–1st, British Aprilia Superteens #89    Aprilia
2009–26th, Red Bull MotoGP Rookies Cup #89    KTM FFR 125 / 1st, Thundersport GB GP3 Championship #89    Honda RS125R
2010–6th, British 125cc Championship #89    Honda RS125R
2011–18th, CEV Moto3 Championship #89    Aprilia RS 125
2012–14th, CEV Moto3 Championship #89    KRP Honda
2013–24th, CEV Moto3 Championship (One race only) #89    Honda NSF250R 
2014–31st, Supersport World Championship #89    Honda CBR600RR
2016–6th, British National Superstock 1000 Championship #89    Kawasaki ZX-10R
2017–5th British National Superstock 1000 Championship #89    Kawasaki ZX-10R

Grand Prix motorcycle racing

By season

By class

Races by year
(key) (Races in bold indicate pole position; races in italics indicate fastest lap)

Supersport World Championship

Races by year
(key) (Races in bold indicate pole position; races in italics indicate fastest lap)

External links

1995 births
Living people
English motorcycle racers
Moto3 World Championship riders
Supersport World Championship riders
Sportspeople from Swindon
Moto2 World Championship riders